The Alloway Auld Kirk, which dates back to the 16th Century, is a ruin in Alloway, South Ayrshire, Scotland, celebrated as the scene of the witches' dance in the poem "Tam o' Shanter" by Robert Burns.

Robert Burns
William Burnes, father of the poet, is buried in the graveyard together with his daughter Isabella as well as two of his nieces. Alloway was where he and his wife had first raised their family before moving to Mount Oliphant and Lochlea, and William had attempted to maintain the grounds of the Kirk, which was already a ruin at the time. The original memorial stone has eroded and the present day stone differs in wording, memorializing both of Burns's parents, and includes an epitaph the poet wrote for his father. Burns's sister, Isabella Burns Begg, is also buried in the Kirkyard, along with other notable figures such as David Cathcart, Lord Alloway.

Robert Burns presented his friend John Richmond with a silver mounted snuffbox made with wood taken from the rafters of the Auld Alloway Kirk. The snuffbox bears the inscription; 

A David Auld removed the remaining rafters and used them to make chairs and other souvenirs, making a considerable profit from the sales.

Restoration and conservation
Following restoration work, the Kirk and graveyard were reopened to the public by Scottish First Minister Alex Salmond in April 2008. The church itself is a scheduled monument and the churchyard a Category B listed building.

See also
List of Church of Scotland parishes
Scheduled monuments in South Ayrshire

References

External links

Alloway Parish Church
View of Alloway Kirk and surrounding Cemetery
Church Graves photo
Video footage of St Mungo's Holy Well, Alloway, Ayrshire
Video footage of the kirk and some insights into the Tam o' Shanter poem
The Masonic Friendship that created Tam O’Shanter

Churches in South Ayrshire
Church of Scotland churches in Scotland
Category A listed buildings in South Ayrshire
Listed churches in Scotland
Robert Burns
Scheduled Ancient Monuments in South Ayrshire
Buildings and structures in Ayr